This article lists notable literary events and publications in 1599.

Events
January – English poet Edmund Spenser is buried near Geoffrey Chaucer at Westminster Abbey, beginning the tradition of Poets' Corner.
Spring/Summer – The Globe Theatre is built in Southwark, at this time beyond the jurisdiction of the London city authorities, utilising material from The Theatre.
June 4 – The Bishops' Ban of 1599: Middleton's Microcynicon: Six Snarling Satires and Marston's Scourge of Villainy are publicly burned as the English ecclesiastical authorities crack down on the craze for satire in the past year. Richard Bancroft, Bishop of London and John Whitgift, Archbishop of Canterbury tighten their enforcement of existing censorship. Earlier, minor works like pamphlets and plays were being published only with the approval of the Wardens of the Stationers Company and without ecclesiastical review; this arrangement is terminated.
June 7 – John Day kills fellow playwright Henry Porter, allegedly in self-defence.
September 21 – The first recorded performance of Shakespeare's Julius Caesar takes place at the Globe Theatre in London, according to the Swiss traveller Thomas Platter the Younger.
Late – War of the Theatres: Satire, being prohibited in print, breaks out in the London theatres. In Histriomastix, Marston satirizes Jonson's pride through the character Chrisoganus; Jonson responds by satirizing Marstons's wordy style in Every Man out of His Humour, acted by the Lord Chamberlain's Men.
The English comic actor Will Kempe leaves the Lord Chamberlain's Men earlier in the year, probably to be replaced by the end of it by Robert Armin.
King James VI of Scotland arranges for a company of English players to erect a playhouse and perform in his country.
The first printing in England of Richard de Bury's  The Philobiblon (1345) is made by Oxford bibliophile Thomas James.

New books

Prose
George Abbot – A Brief Description of the Whole World
Mateo Alemán – Guzmán de Alfarache
John Bodenham – Wits' Theater
Roger Fenton – An Answer to William Alabaster, His Motives
Ferrante Imperato – Dell'Historia Naturale
Thomas Morley – The First Book of Consort Lessons
John Rainolds – Th'Overthrow of Stage Plays

Drama
Anonymous
A Larum for London (or c. 1602)
Sir Clyomon and Sir Clamydes published (written c. 1570)
A Warning for Fair Women published
Thomas Dekker
Old Fortunatus
Patient Grissel (with Henry Chettle and William Haughton)
The Shoemaker's Holiday
Michael Drayton, Richard Hathwaye, Anthony Munday, & Robert Wilson – Sir John Oldcastle
Robert Greene 
Alphonsus King of Aragon (published)
(attributed) George a Greene, the Pinner of Wakefield published
Ben Jonson – Every Man out of His Humour
Hermann Kirchner – Coriolanus tragicomica
John Marston – Antonio and Mellida
Histriomastix
Jack Drum's Entertainment
Henry Porter – The Two Angry Women of Abingdon published
William Shakespeare – As You Like It, Much Ado About Nothing, Henry V, and Julius Caesar (approximate date)

Poetry
Samuel Daniel – Musophilus
Sir John Davies
Hymnes of Astraea
Nosce Teipsum
Thomas Middleton – Microcynicon: Six Snarling Satires
George Peele – The Love of King David and Faire Bethsabe
"W. Shakespeare" (and others unacknowledged) – The Passionate Pilgrime

Births
April 23 – Edward Sheldon, English translator of religious works (died 1687)
May 30 – Samuel Bochart, French Biblical scholar (died 1667)
July 23 – Stephanius, Danish royal historiographer (died 1650)
August 14 – Méric Casaubon, English classicist (died 1671)
October 31 – Denzil Holles, 1st Baron Holles, English statesman and writer (died 1680)
unknown date
Madeleine de Souvré, marquise de Sablé, French writer of maxims (died 1678)
Zera Yacob, Ethiopian philosopher (died 1692)

Deaths
January 13 – Edmund Spenser, English poet (born 1552)
June – Henry Porter, English dramatist
October 9 – Reginald Scot, English writer on witchcraft (born c. 1538)
October 18 – Daniel Adam z Veleslavína, Czech lexicographer (born 1546)
November 29 – Christopher Barker, English printer to Queen Elizabeth I of England (born c. 1529)
unknown dates
Jerónimo Bermúdez, Spanish dramatist (born 1530)
Dominicus Lampsonius, Flemish humanist poet (born 1532 in literature)
Philip Lonicer, German historian (unknown year of birth)

References

 
Years of the 16th century in literature